Rock Ridge is a census-designated place (CDP) in the town of Greenwich, Fairfield County, Connecticut, United States. Rock Ridge was first listed as a CDP prior to the 2020 census.

References 

Census-designated places in Fairfield County, Connecticut
Census-designated places in Connecticut